Path Analysis may refer to:

 Path analysis (statistics), a statistical method of testing cause/effect relationships
 Path analysis (computing), a method for finding the trail that leads users to websites
 Critical path method, an operations research technique
 Main path analysis, a method for tracing the most significant citation chains in a citation network.